Alexander Kevin "Zander" Diamond (born 12 March 1985) is a Scottish former professional footballer and current assistant manager of Lowland League club Broomhill. 

Diamond played as a centre-back and began his career with Scottish Premier League club Aberdeen, before moving to Oldham Athletic in 2011; he later played for Burton Albion, Northampton Town and Mansfield Town in England. He won eleven caps for Scotland under-21s.

Club career

Aberdeen
Raised in the west of Scotland in Dumbarton, Alexandria-born Diamond graduated from the youth team at Aberdeen in his first full season and made his League debut against Dundee United at Tannadice, coming on as a substitute at half time in 2003–04 season. He made his first start for the club in a Scottish League Cup match v Dumbarton in September 2004. Later in the same season, he scored his first senior goal for the club in a 3–1 win against Kilmarnock at Pittodrie. He won the "Young Player of the Month" award for February.

In the 2005–06 season, Jimmy Calderwood was appointed Aberdeen manager. He quickly tied Diamond down on a long-term contract after his partnership with Aberdeen captain Russell Anderson helped the club narrowly miss out on European qualification.

However, in season 2007–08, Aberdeen qualified for the UEFA Cup group section after beating Dnipro on away goals. They were drawn in Group B against Panathanaikos, Lokomotiv Moscow, Atlético Madrid and FC Copenhagen. Diamond scored in the 1–1 draw against Lokomotiv Moscow, Branislav Ivanovic scoring the equaliser. After qualifying from the group, they faced Bayern Munich in the last 32, drawing 2–2 at Pittodrie in the first leg. They went out on aggregate 7–3 after a 5–1 defeat in the Allianz Arena. On 18 January 2009, he achieved the feat of scoring twice against Celtic in an SPL match at Pittodrie which Aberdeen won 4–2. Diamond and team-mate Michael Paton were carpeted by Aberdeen for offensive remarks made on social media during the visit of Pope Benedict XVI to Scotland.

Diamond made 249 appearances for Aberdeen over eight seasons, scoring 19 goals.

Oldham Athletic
Having previously been expected to sign for Hearts before an ankle injury was identified, on 13 July 2011 Diamond signed a one-year contract with Oldham Athletic. His first goal for the club on 30 July 2011 came with a headed goal against Fleetwood Town in a pre–season friendly, which Oldham Athletic won, 1–0. He made his competitive club debut on the first day of the 2011–12 season, starting the Football League match against Sheffield United.

Burton Albion
On 5 June 2012, Diamond signed with League Two club Burton Albion.

He made his debut against Sheffield United at Bramall Lane in the first round of the League Cup, which Burton won on penalties. Diamond scored his first goal for the club in a 6–2 home win against AFC Wimbledon. After finishing 4th, the highest in the club's history in the Football League, they were beaten in the playoffs by eventual winners Bradford City. On 26 May, Burton called him back to play in their Play-Off Final game against Fleetwood Town. He started on the bench but came on as a sub.

Northampton Town
On 21 February 2014, Diamond joined League Two side Northampton Town on loan for the remainder of the 2013–14 season. On 7 May 2014, Diamond signed a three-year contract for the Cobblers after a successful loan spell with the club. The move became effective at the start of pre-season, at which time he spoke of his positive experiences in English football and the relative anonymity he enjoyed compared with living in Aberdeen.

He made over 100 league appearances for Northampton, experiencing a promotion as winners of League Two in 2016 and maintaining the club's status in League One in the following season. He was named the club's 'Player of the year' for 2017, but despite this he was one of several players allowed to leave when their contracts expired.

Mansfield Town
Diamond joined Mansfield Town of EFL League Two on 12 May 2017.

He was transfer-listed by Mansfield at the end of the 2017–18 season. Diamond retired in October 2018 due to injury.

International career
Having earlier appeared for the Under-19s and Under-20s, Diamond captained the Scottish under-21 international side, winning 11 caps and scoring once, between 2004 and 2006. He also appeared once for the B team in December 2004.

Career statistics

References

External links

 
Profile and stats at AFC Heritage Trust

1985 births
Living people
People from Alexandria, West Dunbartonshire
Scottish footballers
Scotland under-21 international footballers
Scotland B international footballers
Association football defenders
Aberdeen F.C. players
Oldham Athletic A.F.C. players
Burton Albion F.C. players
Northampton Town F.C. players
Mansfield Town F.C. players
Scottish Premier League players
English Football League players
People educated at Our Lady & St Patrick's High School
Footballers from West Dunbartonshire